Wörsbach may refer to:

 Wörsbach (Emsbach), a river of Hesse, Germany, tributary of the Emsbach
 Wörsbach (Odenbach), a river of Rhineland-Palatinate, Germany, tributary of the Odenbach